On the morning of March 6, 2008, an unknown individual placed a small bomb in front of a United States Armed Forces recruiting station in Times Square, located in Midtown Manhattan in New York City. There were no injuries. A security camera shows the bomber riding a bicycle as he approaches the station, dismounting the bike and planting the bomb, and then speeding off shortly before the blast.

New York City police has yet to identify the bomber. Because of their similarities, investigators have suggested the bombing may be linked to two prior and one subsequent New York City bombings done in front of the Mexican Consulate in 2007, the British Consulate in 2005  and an Upper East Side Starbucks in 2009; however, upon the arrest of a suspect police now believe the Starbucks blast to be unrelated.

A letter sent to Congress with the words "we did it" was originally thought to be connected to the bombing, but ended up being completely unrelated to the incident. Investigators also initially suspected the bombing may be related to an incident on the Canada–United States border in February 2008. Pictures of Times Square and anarchist-type material were found in a car that was randomly stopped by the police.

Incident

The bombing took place at around 3:43 a.m in front of a United States Armed Forces recruiting station in Times Square. A security camera mounted at 1501 Broadway shows an individual riding a bicycle eastbound on 38th Street and Madison Avenue. He headed toward the recruiting center, putting himself out of camera view. He then placed an improvised explosive device in front of the building, and left the area on a bicycle, reappearing on camera.

The bomber was seen riding a bicycle wearing a grey hooded jacket and a backpack, and was described as a "large" man. Retired New York City detective Ray Pierce suggested he may be a bicycle messenger, noting the "comfortable" way he is seen riding his bicycle. He also described the bomber as being a young, "frustrated" individual, who is trying to send a "confusing" message. Because of the low-powered explosive and the attack coming in the early morning hours, Pierce has suggested that the bomber is more likely trying to send a message, rather than hurting anyone.

Kelly described the bomb as "low-order explosive" and "not a particularly sophisticated device" contained in a military-style ammunition box.

Investigation

Bicycle
A 1980s blue 10-speed Ross bicycle was found by construction workers in a dumpster located on East 38th Street, a few blocks from the bombing. Unaware of the bombing, several of the workers rode around on the bicycle, which made it harder for investigators to obtain fingerprints. After they heard about the bombing, they turned the bicycle over to the police. Investigators believed that the bicycle was the one used by the bomber. Fingerprints lifted from the bicycle ended up having "no value" in figuring out the identity of the bomber. New York City Police Commissioner Ray Kelly stated "I don't think anyone was seen leaving the bike". Investigators hoped that the public would be able to focus on the bike for up to a month after the bombing occurred. The bicycle was manufactured and sold in the 1980s at a store called "Yonkers Cycle Center" located in Westchester County, New York. The store has since been closed down and the owner has died. Investigators believed the bicycle may have recently changed owners, as one investigator stated "someone may have sold it at a yard sale". Investigators believe the bicycle was stored indoors for most of the time.

Letters
Hours after the bombing, Democratic Party members of Capitol Hill received letters that contained the words "Happy New Year, We did it" and a picture of a man standing in front of the Times Square recruiting center. The letters also included  a 64-page anti-Iraq War statement. The letters were sent in  manila envelopes with two $1 stamps and a white label. Because each letter was numbered, investigators believed over 100 letters were mailed out. Recipients of the letters were warned not to open them and to notify police. Investigators originally believed the letters were connected with the bombing, but were proved to be completely unrelated to the incident and a coincidence.

The letters were mailed by David Karnes, a Los Angeles area lawyer and anti-war protester. After Karnes was questioned and his house was searched by the Federal Bureau of Investigation (FBI), his claim of not being connected with the bombing was proved to be valid. He was actually trying to send an anti-Iraq War statement and advice for the Democrats on how to win the 2008 presidential election. In an interview with The New York Times, David Karne's mother stated "I know when he said, ‘We did it,’ he was talking about the Democratic Party". She also stated that the picture of the man standing in front of the Times Square recruiting center was  David Karnes. Investigators have said that the letters must have been sent weeks before the bombing occurred, since they went through the standard screening process, which can take up to a week or more. A law enforcement officer referred to the letters as an "ugly coincidence".

Possible connection to past incidents

Similarities to past bombings
Investigators have noted the similarities between the Times Square bombings and past bombings in New York. In 2005 an individual riding a bike threw a grenade in front of the British consulate. A similar incident occurred in front of the Mexican consulate, which also involved an individual throwing a grenade in front of the window. Like the Times Square bombing, both incidents took place in the early morning hours and involved a man riding a bicycle. Investigators have not linked the incidents.

Canada–U.S. border incident
After the bombing, investigators revisited an incident that occurred on the Canada–United States border. In February 2008, four men attempted to cross the border into Canada from New York. While they were being questioned by Canadian border agents, one of the men fled from the car, getting away. He left behind a backpack, inside of which pictures of New York City locations were found, including pictures of the Times Square recruiting center. At the time of the incident U.S. authorities did not find any evidence of criminal activity. Investigators have not linked the bombing to the border incident. The men have been described as "anarchist types". A U.S. government official has stated he strongly doubts a link between the border incident and bombing will be found, noting that the recruiting center is in a prominent location in Times Square and would most likely appear in pictures taken at Times Square.

Response
Mayor Michael Bloomberg, Police Commissioner Raymond Kelly and Federal Bureau of Investigation officials appeared later in the morning in a joint news conference. Mayor Bloomberg denounced the attack and said that it "insults every one of our brave men and women in uniform stationed around the world.”

John McCain’s presidential campaign released a statement after the bombing:

Presidential candidate Hillary Clinton also commented on the bombing:

On June 18, 2013, the FBI released new video footage of the purported bomber, also announcing that a $65,000 reward would be given to anyone who could provide information leading to his identification, arrest and conviction. The reward was increased to $115,000 in April 2015.

See also
2010 Times Square car bomb attempt
Terrorism in the United States

Notes

2008 bombing
2008 crimes in the United States
March 2008 crimes
Improvised explosive device bombings in the United States
Political violence in the United States
Terrorist incidents in the United States in 2008
Terrorist incidents by unknown perpetrators
2008 in New York City
Crimes in New York City
Terrorist incidents in New York City
Attacks in the United States in 2008
2000s in Manhattan